Warren T. Treadgold (born April 30, 1949, Oxford, England) is an American historian and specialist in Byzantine studies. He is the National Endowment for the Humanities Professor of Byzantine Studies at Saint Louis University. His interest in the political, economic, military, social, and cultural history of the Byzantine Empire extends to the Byzantine historians themselves.  Treadgold has also taught at UCLA, Stanford, Hillsdale, Berkeley, and Florida International University.

He has been married since September 25, 1982 to Irina Andreescu-Treadgold.

Education
Treadgold holds an AB from Harvard University (1970) and a PhD from the same university (1977).

Books
 The University We Need: Reforming America’s Higher Education (New York: Encounter Books, 2018);

 The Middle Byzantine Historians (New York: Palgrave Macmillan, 2013);

 The Early Byzantine Historians (New York: Palgrave Macmillan, 2007);

 A Concise History of Byzantium (New York: Palgrave Macmillan, 2001);

 

 Byzantium and Its Army, 284–1081 (Stanford: Stanford University Press, 1995);

 

 The Byzantine State Finances in the Eighth and Ninth Centuries (New York: East European Monographs, 1982); and 

 The Nature of the Bibliotheca of Photius (Washington, D.C.: Dumbarton Oaks, 1980).

References

External links
 Biographical Note. Academia.edu. Retrieved 2019-04-10.

American medievalists
American Byzantinists
Harvard University alumni
Saint Louis University faculty
Living people
1949 births
Scholars of Byzantine history